The Puerto Rico national beach soccer team represents Puerto Rico in international beach soccer competitions and is controlled by the Federación Puertorriqueña de Fútbol, the governing body for football in Puerto Rico.

History
2013 was the year when the Puerto Rico national beach soccer team was formed. Eieri Jordan was the most involved person with the project. Vitor Hugo Barros was appointed as head coach and a team mixed with young and experienced players made the trip to Nassau, Bahamas to play on the 2013 CONCACAF Beach Soccer Championship. They played on Group A against Bahamas, United States and Guatemala. However, they lost all of their matches and managed to score six goals. 

They returned for the 2015 CONCACAF Beach Soccer Championship after hard work to maintain the project alive. Puerto Rico came with a totally new team managed once again by Vitor Hugo Barros and Eieri Jordan. They lost all of their matches and scored only four goals.

Current squad

Achievements

CONCACAF Beach Soccer Championship

See also
2015 CONCACAF Beach Soccer Championship
2015 CONCACAF Beach Soccer Championship
List of national association football teams by nickname

References

External links
Fan Website
CONCACAF official website

North American national beach soccer teams
B